Canby Family Practice Clinic in Canby, California, United States is a medical and dental clinic. Established in 1987, the clinic moved to its current location in 2001. Medical, dental, behavioral health, and related services are available.  Medicaid (Medi-Cal) and Medicare insurances are accepted. The clinic is now a part of the Last Frontier Healthcare District and is also a member of the Health Alliance of Northern California.

History 

The Canby Family Practice Clinic (CFPC) was founded in 1987, originally offering limited medical and dental services. Expanded dental and behavioral health services were added later. It moved to its present location, across Hwy 299 from its original site, in 2001 when a new facility was built with supporting funds from the Rural Demonstration Project, the California Wellness Foundation and the California Endowment. A subsequent grant from the Sierra Health Foundation of Sacramento made possible the purchase of state-of-the-art fiber optic hand pieces, a new compressor and dental suite lighting unit. In 2012, CFPC received another USDA Rural Development grant of $75,000 with $25,000 in matching funds from the clinic, through the American Recovery & Reinvestment Act to purchase four new pen tablets and upgrading the clinic’s electronic health records system, bringing it into compliance with the Health Information Technology for Economic and Clinical Health Act.

Disaster preparedness 

Canby Family Practice Clinic is a member of the Modoc County Disaster Council and the Modoc County Healthcare Coalition.  Both of these groups coordinate their resources for unified disaster preparedness in Modoc County.

Current providers 
 Matthew Edmonds, MD
 Wendy Richardson, PA-C
 Stephen Stewart, PA-C
Walter Havekorst, DDS
Raymond Mandel, Clinical Psychologist-Behavioral Health

References 

Clinics in California